Pluta may refer to:

 Pluta, a village in Butoiești, Mehedinți County, Romania
 Pluta (surname)

See also